Eoconus bareti is an extinct species of sea snail, a marine gastropod mollusk, in the family Conidae.

Description
The length of the shell attains 35 mm

Distribution
Fossils of this species were found in Brittany, France

References

 Tracey S., Craig B., Belliard L. & Gain O. (2017). One, four or forty species? - early Conidae (Mollusca, Gastropoda) that led to a radiation and biodiversity peak in the late Lutetian Eocene of the Cotentin, NW France. Carnets de Voyages Paléontologiques dans le Bassin Anglo-Parisien. 3: 1-38

External links
 Worldwide Mollusc Species Data Base: Conus bareti

bareti